Carnival Miracle is a  operated by Carnival Cruise Line.  Built by Kværner Masa-Yards at its Helsinki New Shipyard in Helsinki, Finland, she was  floated out on June 5, 2003, and christened by United States Army soldier Jessica Lynch in Jacksonville, Florida, on February 27, 2004.  Soon after the conclusion of the christening ceremony, she departed on her maiden voyage, a three-day cruise to the Bahamas.

Carnival Miracle has an eleven-story atrium with a ruby-red glass ceiling, which is also part of the "whale tail" funnel. Next to every room is a large picture of a famous fictional character, such as Long John Silver or Sherlock Holmes.

Areas of operation

Prior to April 2012, Miracle undertook Caribbean cruises from Fort Lauderdale and Tampa Bay, Florida during the winter months and during the summer months from New York City.

From April 2012 to March 2013, Carnival Miracle sailed year-round from New York City, New York to the Bahamas and the Caribbean.

In March 2013, Carnival Miracle sailed through the Panama Canal repositioning to the West Coast sailing alternating cruises from Long Beach, California & Seattle, Washington.

On March 8, 2015 the Miracle entered "Drydock #2" operated by BAE Systems at Pier 70 in San Francisco, California to be refurbished.

In October 2015, Carnival announced that Carnival Miracle, would be repositioned to China in 2018 offering year-round short cruises. This plan was subsequently cancelled in May 2016 and in November 2016, Carnival announced that Miracle would relocate to Tampa, Florida in January 2018 to undertake cruises to the western Caribbean.

On January 27, 2018, Carnival Miracle departed on her first sailing from the new homeport. Before reaching Tampa, the ship transited the Panama Canal.

In June 2018, the cruise line announced that Carnival Miracle would reposition to San Diego, California in late 2019. It is intended that she will operate from there until February 2020.

When Carnival Splendor repositioned from Long Beach to Sydney in October 2019, Carnival Miracle was temporarily homeported at the Port of Long Beach. She did 7-day Mexican Riviera cruises, serving as a placeholder for Carnival Panorama until the latter took over the itinerary on December 11, 2019.

She will also do seasonal repositionings to San Francisco during the spring and summer months beginning March 19, 2020.

In March 2023, it was announced that Carnival Miracle would reposition to Galveston in October 2024 and will be the fourth ship based out of that homeport. The ship will offer longer nine to twelve day sailings to the Western and Eastern Caribbean.

References

Notes

Bibliography

External links

Official Website

Ships built in Helsinki
Miracle
Panamax cruise ships
2003 ships